A gopuram or gopura ( Telugu: గోపురం, Tamil: கோபுரம், Malayalam: ഗോപുരം, Kannada: ಗೋಪುರ) is a monumental entrance tower, usually ornate, at the entrance of a Hindu temple, in the South Indian architecture of the Southern Indian states of Tamil Nadu, Andhra Pradesh, Kerala, Karnataka, and Telangana, and Sri Lanka.  In other areas of India they are much more modest, while in Southern Indian temples they are very often by far the highest part of the temple.

Ancient and early medieval temples feature smaller gopuram, while in later temples they are a prominent feature of Hindu Dravidian style; in many cases the temple compound was expanded and new larger gopuram built along the new boundary. They are topped by the kalasam, a bulbous stone finial. They function as gateways through the walls that surround the temple complex. Another towering structure located towards the center of the temple is the Vimanam. Both of them are designed and constructed as per rules given in the texts of Vaastu shastra.

The gopuram's origins can be traced back to early structures of the Pallava kings, and relate to the central shikhara towers of North India. Between the twelfth and sixteenth century, during the Pandya, Nayaka and Vijayanagara era when Hindu temples increasingly became a hub of the urban life, these gateways became a dominant feature of a temple's outer appearance, eventually overshadowing the inner sanctuary which became obscured from view by the gopuram's colossal size and courtyards. It also dominated the inner sanctum in amount of ornamentation. Often a shrine has more than one gopuram. They also appear in architecture outside India, especially Khmer architecture, as at Angkor Wat.

A large Dravidian-style temple, or koil, may have multiple gopurams as the openings into successively smaller walled enclosures around the main shrine, with the largest generally at the outer edges. The temple compound is typically square or rectangular with at least the outermost wall having gopuras, often from the four cardinal directions. The multiple storeys of a gopuram typically repeat the lower level features on a rhythmic diminishing scale. The inner sanctum and its towering roof (the central deity's shrine) is also called the Vimanam, although in the south it is typically smaller than the gopurams in large temples.

Etymology

The Tamil derivation is from the two words: கோ (kō) and புறம் (puram) meaning 'king' and 'exterior' respectively. It originates from the Sangam age when it was known as ஓங்கு நிலை வாயில் (ōnggu nilai vāyil) meaning 'imperishable gateway'.

The  Telugu derivation is from the two words : కోపు (Kōpu) and అరం (Araṁ) meaning "Top" and "to exist".

An alternative derivation is from the Sanskrit word gopuram, which can be broken down to go, which means either 'a city' or 'a cow', and puram, 'a town', or 'a settlement'.

Dr. Sthapati explains the meaning of the words gopuram and vimanam thus. Vimanam means measure, indicating the number of measures made in the construction and design of that structure. Gopuram consist of two words, gawa and puram, meaning the place from which all the energy that exists in all living beings comes inside.

Architecture

A gopuram is usually a tapering oblong in form with ground-level wooden doors, often richly decorated, providing access. Above is the tapering or "battered" gopuram, divided into many storeys (talas), which diminish in size as the gopuram tower narrows. Usually the tower is topped with a barrel vaulted roof with a finial. The form began rather modestly in the 10th century, as at Shore Temple, Mamallapuram, with the 11th century Brihadeeswarar Temple in Thanjavur marking a crucial step forward with two multi-storey gopurams from that period, much larger than any earlier ones, though much smaller than the main tower (vimanam) of the temple. The four gopurams of the Thillai Nataraja Temple, Chidambaram are important early examples, begun in the mid-13th century but completed over a longer period. Gopurams are exquisitely decorated with sculpture and carvings and painted with a variety of themes derived from the Hindu mythology, particularly those associated with the presiding deity of the temple where the gopuram is located.

The two tallest gopuras are both modern, at least in part. The Ranganathaswamy Temple, Srirangam, Tamil Nadu, has 21 gopurams (tower gateways), including the towering  Rajagopuram (shrine of the main gateway), which is claimed as the tallest temple tower in Asia. The -tall 13-tiered  Rajagopuram was completed in 1987 and dominates the landscape for kilometers around, while the remaining 20 gopurams were built between the 14th and 17th centuries.  Competing for the title of "tallest" is the twenty storey  gopura at the modern Murdeshwar Temple, which, unusually, is provided with a lift.

See also
 List of tallest Gopurams
 Candi bentar, split gateways for Indonesian Hindu temples
 Paduraksa, greater gateways to inner and more sacred areas in Indonesian Hindu temples

Notes

References

Harle, J.C., The Art and Architecture of the Indian Subcontinent, 2nd edn. 1994, Yale University Press Pelican History of Art,

External links

Hindu temple architecture
Types of gates
Hindu temples
Hindu architecture

ta:கோபுரம்